Sinovli (also, Sunuvly) is a village in the Lankaran Rayon of Azerbaijan. The village forms part of the municipality of Osakücə.

References 

Populated places in Lankaran District